Jean-Patrick Courtois (born 20 May 1951 in Lyon) is a member of the Senate of France.  He represents the Saône-et-Loire department, and is a member of the Union for a Popular Movement.
He is the mayor of the city of Mâcon, in the Saône-et-Loire department since 2001.

References
Page on the Senate website

1951 births
Living people
Politicians from Lyon
Union for a Popular Movement politicians
Gaullism, a way forward for France
French Senators of the Fifth Republic
Mayors of places in Bourgogne-Franche-Comté
Senators of Saône-et-Loire